Geovanna de Oliveira Tominaga (born April 12, 1980) is a Brazilian actress and television host.

Biography

Tominaga is of Japanese, Italian and Amerindian descent.  She started her career when she was 12 years old, working in a show of Angélica, in Rede Manchete. After a brief stint as an actress, she became a host of TV Globinho, for children. She is the current host of Video Show on Globo TV, along with other people. During her live show, Tominaga was interviewing actress Suzana Vieira when she suddenly took the microphone from Tominaga's hands. Vieira said she had "no patience for a person who is starting". The episode ended up on YouTube and became a hit.

References

External links 
 

1980 births
Living people
People from São José dos Campos
Brazilian people of Japanese descent
Brazilian people of Italian descent
Brazilian people of indigenous peoples descent
Brazilian child actresses
Brazilian television actresses
Brazilian telenovela actresses
Brazilian television presenters
Brazilian women television presenters